Bhoopadathil Illatha Oridam is a 2012 Malayalam-language film written and directed by Joe Chalissery based on the short story "Deshathinte Vijayam" by Sethu. A political satire by genre, the film stars Sreenivasan, Nivin Pauly, Iniya and Rajsri. It was released on 14 September 2012, and the critical reaction to the film was mostly negative.

Plot
Madhavankutty is a schoolmaster in a remote village. He is respected by his students and his friends.  But his wife keeps complaining that he does not help her in house. The village is "identity-less", as the title suggests.

When a theft happens in a moneylender's shop, everyone around is baffled. It results in sleepless nights for the panchayat president and the police officer in charge of the area. As they have no inkling about who the culprit may be, they devise a plan to catch someone with a previous record.

Madhavankutty is the sole eyewitness, as the shop is visible from the place where he lives. Much of the story is devoted to showing how Madhavankutty dodges the pressure tactics of the police and counters their arguments. But after this incident, people start moving away from him and the film is about how the incident changes his life.

Cast
 Sreenivasan as Madhavankutty 
 Nivin Pauly as Murali
 Iniya as Bhama
 Rajasree Nair as Vimala
 Nedumudi Venu as the Panchayat president Ezhuthachan
 Innocent as SI Idikkula
 Suraj Venjarammoodu as Sugunan
 Albert Fernandez
 Sasi Kalinga as Kumara
 Salim Kumar as Anto
 Sunil Sukhada
 Aju Varghese as Madhu
 Kochu Preman as Aravindhan 
 Zeenath as Karthiayini / tea shop owner
 Lakshmi Priya

References

Watch on Gigaplex now

2010s Malayalam-language films
2012 drama films
2012 films
Indian satirical films
Indian drama films
Films based on short fiction